The Fâstâca is a right tributary of the river Stemnic in Romania. It flows into the Stemnic in Bălești.

References

Rivers of Romania
Rivers of Vaslui County